Dawsonville is an unincorporated community in Montgomery County, Maryland, United States.

References

Unincorporated communities in Montgomery County, Maryland
Unincorporated communities in Maryland